French Creek Farm, also known as The Aman Farm, is a historic farm and national historic district located in West Vincent Township, Chester County, Pennsylvania.  The farm has four contributing buildings.  They are a stone spring house (1795), stuccoed small barn and wagonshed (1796–97), -story stone smokehouse (1799), and the farmhouse.  The farmhouse was built in three stages and is a -story, six-bay stone dwelling with a gable roof.  The oldest section was built in 1804–04, with additions made in 1808 and 1812.

It was added to the National Register of Historic Places in 1988.

References

Farms on the National Register of Historic Places in Pennsylvania
Historic districts on the National Register of Historic Places in Pennsylvania
Houses completed in 1812
Houses in Chester County, Pennsylvania
National Register of Historic Places in Chester County, Pennsylvania